Bereza may refer to:

 Bereza, Lublin Voivodeship, Poland
 Bereza-Osovcy, an air base in Brest Oblast, Belarus
 FC Bereza-2010, a football club, Belarus
 Bereza (surname)
 Bereza (Desna), a tributary of the Desna in Ukraine
 Bereza (Mezha), a tributary of Mezha in Russia
A transliteration  without diacritics of the Russian word "Берёза", see Beryoza (disambiguation)

See also
Bereza Kartuska, Polish name of Belarusian town Byaroza